Theertham is a 1987 Indian Malayalam film, directed by Mohan and produced by G. Jayakumar and G.P. Vijayakumar. The film stars Nedumudi Venu, Pallavi Joshi, Innocent and Thilakan in the lead roles. The film has musical score by Bombay Ravi.

Cast 

Nedumudi Venu as Vishnu Namboothiri
Pallavi Joshi as Sreedevi
Innocent as Josutty
Thilakan as Chellappannan
Venu Nagavally as Radhakrishnan
Balachandran Chullikkad as Shivan
Murali as Michael
Babu Namboothiri as Mashu
Balan Kattoor as Kuttappan
Bindu as Rema
Jagannathan as Mammadali
KPAC Sunny as Doctor
Shari as Mercy
Surasu as Sreedevi's father
T. P. Madhavan as Sudhakaran
Valsala Menon as Bank Manager
Kollam Thulasi as Man at Bar
Vettukkili Prakash as Kunjan Namboothiri
Padmakumar as Cook Nair

Soundtrack 
The music was composed by Bombay Ravi and the lyrics were written by Kavalam Narayana Panicker and Balachandran Chullikkad. The song "Bas More Nainan" marks the first Malayalam song and the first South Indian song that Bollywood playback singer Alka Yagnik has ever sung.

References

External links 
 

1987 films
1980s Malayalam-language films
Films shot in Ottapalam
Films shot at Varikkasseri Mana